Sheikh Luthfur Rahman (born 1920) was a Bangladeshi composer and singer. He received the Ekushey Padak from the Government of Bangladesh in 1979. He was notable for the composition of the songs "Orey Bhai, Bangladesher Bangali Ar Nai", “Shunen Hujur Bagher Jaat Eyi Bangalira”, “Manbona Bondhon Manbona” and others.

Early life
Since age nine, Rahman was trained under his father, Sheikh Abdul Huque, in Nazrul Sangeet and Rabindra Sangeet. Umapodo Bhattacharjyo, the principle of the local high school, taught him pure classical music. He also received training in pure classical songs under Onathnath Basu and Biddyut Biswas.

Career
Rahman moved to Kolkata in 1942. He joined the Song Publicity Department and was enlisted at the Kolkata Radio Station. After 1947, he settled in the then East Pakistan and joined the radio station as an enlisted artiste. From 1956 to 1964, he lived in erstwhile West Pakistan where he taught at the Nazrul Academy, in Karachi.

Rahman wrote an autobiography title "Jiboner Gaan Gayee".

References

1920 births
People from Satkhira District
Bangladeshi composers
Recipients of the Ekushey Padak
Year of death missing
Place of death missing
Pakistani musicians
Indian musicians